The European Commissioner for Economy is a member of the European Commission. The current Economy Commissioner is Paolo Gentiloni.

From 2014 to 2019 the post was named Commissioner for Economic and Financial Affairs, Taxation and Customs. Until 2014 the post was named Commissioner for Taxation and Customs Union, Audit and Anti-Fraud and was previously divided prior to 2010, with audit being under control of the Commissioner for Administrative Affairs. The post was abolished in 2014, when the Juncker Commission merged the post with that of the Economic and Financial Affairs portfolio.

The post is responsible for the EU's customs union and taxation policy. The European Union has had a customs union since the creation of the European Economic Community and that union extends to Turkey, Andorra and San Marino. Since 2010 it gained responsibility for audit (budgetary discharge, internal audit, counter fraud): in particular the Internal Audit Service and the European Anti-fraud Office.

List of commissioners

See also
 Directorate-General for Taxation and Customs Union
 European Union withholding tax
 EU VAT
 Single European Act

External links
 Commissioner's website
 Commissioner's Press Releases
 Commission Tax and Customs website

Eurogroup
Taxation and Customs Union
Taxation and Customs Union
Foreign trade of the European Union
Fraud in the European Union